Louisiana held its first United States House of Representatives elections following its April 1812 admission to the Union on September 28–30, 1812. A special election for a seat in the 12th Congress (that convened in 1811) and a general election for a seat in the 13th Congress (to convene in 1813) were held at the same time, and had nearly-identical results.

Special election to the 12th Congress

General election to the 13th Congress

See also 
 1810 and 1811 United States House of Representatives elections
 1812 and 1813 United States House of Representatives elections
 List of United States representatives from Louisiana

Notes

References 

1812
Louisiana
United States House of Representatives